Moonee Beach, Australia, is a small town on the Mid North Coast of NSW. It is located along the newly upgraded Pacific Highway. It is 13 km out of Coffs Harbour CBD, 543 km north of Sydney and 378 km south of Brisbane.

Facilities
Moonee Beach has a shopping centre with a Coles supermarket, Best & Less, full service health club Coffs Coast Health Club, bakery, chemist, butcher, Subway, dollar shop and newsagent. There is also a caravan park and a creekside reserve for day use. There is also a tavern used by locals and holiday makers, a day care centre and a fish and chip shop.

References

 https://www.coffsharbour.nsw.gov.au/pages/Search-Results.aspx/Results.aspx?k=Moonee%20beach=

Mid North Coast